The Indian Air Force's rank structure is based on that of the Royal Air Force. The highest rank attainable in the Indian Air Force is Marshal of the Indian Air Force, conferred by the President of India after exceptional service during wartime. MIAF Arjan Singh was the only officer to have achieved this rank. The head of the Indian Air Force is the Chief of the Air Staff, who holds the rank of Air Chief Marshal. The current Chief of the Air Staff is Air Chief Marshal Vivek Ram Chaudhari, took office on 30 September 2021.

Officer ranks
The following table shows the officer rank insignia for the Indian Air Force.

The IAF rank of pilot officer is a rank in abeyance in the Air Force and is no longer in force, all officers begin as flying officers upon commissioning.

Junior commissioned officer and non-commissioned ranks

Former ranks and rank insignia 
The rank of Pilot Officer is no longer in use; all new officers are commissioned as Flying Officers. The old warrant officer ranks and the rank of flight sergeant were replaced in 1977 by the new warrant officer ranks.

See also
 Comparative military ranks
 Army ranks and insignia of India
 Naval ranks and insignia of India
 Coast Guard ranks and insignia of India
 Border Roads Organisation ranks and insignia of India
 Paramilitary forces ranks and insignia of India
 Police ranks and insignia of India

References

.
India
A
India, Air Force